The 2010 UCI Road World Championships took place in Geelong and Melbourne, Australia, over 5 days from 29 September to 3 October 2010. It was the 83rd UCI Road World Championships and the first time that Australia had held the event. Coincidentally, the title's defender at the road race was an Australian, Cadel Evans, who has a home in Barwon Heads, only 20 km from Geelong.

The time trial and most of the road race elements of the 2010 UCI Road World Championships were staged in Geelong, while the final event, the men's road race, started in Melbourne and went to Geelong, where it finished after 11 laps of the road-race circuit.

The events were spread over five days, allowing recovery time for those riders wishing to take part in both the time trial and the road race. The first event, the men's under-23 time trial resulted in a win for Taylor Phinney, who went on to share third place in the U-23 road race, which was won from a group sprint by Michael Matthews of Australia.  In the women's events, Olympic silver medallist Emma Pooley became the first British rider to win the time trial, and Giorgia Bronzini, bronze medallist in the 2007 championships, won from a three rider chase group.

Switzerland's Fabian Cancellara successfully defended his men's time trial title, achieving a record fourth win: and in the final, showpiece event, Thor Hushovd became the first Norwegian winner, and a bronze for Allan Davis clinched top place in the medal table for the hosts.

Competition schedule
All times are local (UTC+10).

Participating nations

444 cyclists from 49 national federations participated. The number of cyclists per nation that competed is shown in parentheses.

Events summary

Medal table

References

External links

UCI Website for Road World Championships

 
UCI Road World Championships by year
World Championships
Uci
Sports competitions in Melbourne
Sport in Geelong
International cycle races hosted by Australia